David Guttenfelder (born 1969) is an American photojournalist focusing on geopolitical conflict, conservation, and culture. He is currently a photographer with National Geographic, based in Minneapolis. He is known for his photos of North Korea.

Early life and education 
Guttenfelder grew up as a native of Waukee, Iowa. It wasn't until 1990, studying Swahili as a foreign exchange student at the University of Dar es Salaam in Tanzania, where he began to explore photography.

After he returned to the U.S., he pursued his undergraduate studies at the University of Iowa. In the summer of 1993, an extreme rainfall forced the Iowa River to swell, threatening the central University of Iowa campus. He began to document the watery encroachment as a Daily Iowan photographer.

Career 

In 1994, Guttenfelder started his photography career in East Africa with the Associated Press. He was based in Kenya, the Ivory Coast, India and Japan. In 1994, he covered the Rwandan genocide. In 2000, Guttenfelder spent more than a decade covering the wars in Afghanistan and Iraq. During that time, he also started taking trips to North Korea. Later he covered the Israeli Palestinian conflict, the 2008 election of President Obama, as well as the tsunami and nuclear disaster in Japan. In 2011, he helped the Associated Press open a bureau in Pyongyang, making it the first western news agency to have an office in the country. From 2012 to 2014, he traveled to North Korea almost every month and stepped down from his post as chief Asia photographer for the Associated Press. 

In summer 2014, after two decades of constant travel, Guttenfelder accepted a new assignment with National Geographic to photograph Yellowstone National Park. In 2016, he boarded the first cruise ship in decades to travel from the United States to Cuba, and returned to the island to cover Fidel Castro's four-day funeral procession. He returned on several occasions on assignments for National Geographic, publishing in photo essays and on social media platforms like Instagram. Later that year, Guttenfelder traveled to Tanzania to photograph portraits of Jane Goodall for National Geographic documentary Jane, which was released in 2017. 

He is now back in the US as a National Geographic Society fellow, capturing the relationship between people and wildlife. He is photographically exploring his own country and culture for the first time in his professional career. On May 25, 2020, Guttenfelder documented peoples' reactions to the murder of George Floyd in Minneapolis where he lived.

Awards
2002: World Press Photo Award
2005: World Press Photo Award
2006: Photojournalist of the Year, National Press Photographers Association (NPPA). 
2006: World Press Photo Award
2007: World Press Photo Award
2008: First Place, Pictures of the Year International (POYi) Award
2009: Public Prize (Reader's Award) (along with four others), Days Japan International Photojournalism Awards.
2010: World Press Photo Award
2012: Time magazine Instagram Photo of the Year.
2012: Finalist, 2012 Pulitzer Prize in Feature Photography.
2012: Overseas Press Club John Faber, Oliver Rebbot & Feature Photography Awards
2012: World Press Photo Award
2013: Time magazine Instagram Photographer of the Year
2013: Infinity Award from the International Center of Photography.
2014: Shorty Award for Online Photography
2016: World Press Photo Award
Online Journalism Award

References

External links
 
Biography, Mediastorm

Photographers from Iowa
Associated Press photographers
University of Iowa alumni
Living people
1969 births